Martin Welz is a South African journalist and the editor of Noseweek magazine. He is best known for his investigative work on controversial issues including government and corporate corruption.

Early life
Martin Sylvester Welz was born on 19 October 1945 in Worcester, Western Cape, South Africa. He was the fourth son of artist Jean Welz, born in Salzburg, Austria 1900. His mother is Inger Marie Welz (née Christensen), born in Odense, Denmark, in 1908.

Career

Sunday Times
A report by Welz while he was working for the Sunday Times from 1977–1981 saw an R180-million defamation claim instituted against himself and the paper by Lebanese businessman Salim el Hajj. El Hajj had been accused by Welz of a series of frauds in the then-black "homelands". El Hajj fled the country before the case got to court. Welz also worked on South Africa's "Muldergate" Information scandal and helped expose wrongdoing by apartheid-era cabinet ministers, inter alia revealing that both Minister of Manpower and Energy Fanie Botha and State President Nico Diederichs was secretly bankrupt while in office. In 1981–82, Welz was appointed Parliamentary correspondent for Sunday Express, Johannesburg. While at the Express, he won the Stellenbosch farmers' Winery Award (1983) for a series exposing the corrupt pharmaceutical empire established by businessmen Isaac Kay and David Tabatznik.

Noseweek
Noseweek was founded in Cape Town, South Africa, in June 1993.  It contains a minimal amount of advertising and has survived and grown mainly on its sales.

Lawsuits

Dr. Robert Milton Hall 
The first lawsuit against the magazine was brought in 1994 by Dr. Robert Milton Hall, an American tax refugee and millionaire dentist living in Stellenbosch, Western Cape. The trial was in 1996 in the Cape High Court before Judge Johann Conradie.  Noseweek had, inter alia, pointed out Dr. Hall's fraudulent claims to be the "inventor of modern-day dentistry", and his ongoing foreign exchange and tax contraventions.

The magazine was represented by an attorney and advocates and Welz represented himself.  Noseweek and Welz won the case.  Judge Johann Conradie presided and in his judgment found that Dr. Hall, "... sued not to salvage his reputation but to sustain a colossal fraud."  This litigation put the magazine on ice for approximately two years and nearly bankrupted it. It was relaunched thanks to the voluntary contributions of scores of its loyal readers.

FirstRand Bank 
In 2007 Welz represented himself in a court action brought by the FirstRand group to prevent Noseweek from publishing a list of FirstRand clients allegedly involved in a dubious offshore investment scheme. The action was dismissed with costs.

Inge Peacock 
Cape Town businesswoman, Inge Peacock, sued Noseweek and Martin Welz in March 2012. Judge Andre Le Grange of the Cape High Court dismissed Peacock's case with costs, but stated that the plaintiff may pursue damages for defamation against Noseweek.  The resulting publicity created a "Streisand effect" after the mainstream press picked up the story.

Weapons whistleblower 
In 2008 Welz reported that a ship due to dock in Durban harbour carried a shipment of Chinese weapons bound for Zimbabwe.
News of the $1.245 million, 77-ton shipment came via what Welz described as "a whistleblower of conscience," who supplied Noseweek with a commercial invoice, bill of lading and packing list for the shipment.

Awards
 South African Union of Journalists Thomas Pringle Award for Press Freedom.
 Special mention, 2002 Nat Nakasa Award for Media Integrity & Courageous Journalism.
 Joint business category winner, 2004 Mondi Paper Magazine Awards.
 Honorary award for promoting corporate governance through investigative journalism, 2007 Sanlam Financial Journalist of the Year competition.

References

Living people
1945 births
South African journalists
South African editors
South African magazine editors
People from Worcester, South Africa